Overcompensation may refer to:
 Overcompensation (linguistics) or hypercorrection, non-standard language use resulting from over-application of a perceived grammar rule
 Overcompensation (psychology) or compensation, covering real or imagined deficiencies in one area of life with excellence in another area
 Overcompensating (webcomic), a journal/daily blog comic by Jeffrey Rowland